Dorset Council is a local government body in Tasmania, located in the far north-east of the state mainland. Dorset is classified as a rural local government area and has a population of 6,652. The major towns and localities of the region include Bridport, Derby and Ringarooma with Scottsdale the regional centre.

History and attributes
The municipality was established on 2 April 1993 after the amalgamation of the Scottsdale and Ringarooma municipalities. Dorset is classified as regional, agricultural and large under the Australian Classification of Local Governments.

Suburbs

Not in above list
 North Lilydale
 Pipers Brook
 Tayene
 Upper Esk
 Weldborough

Errors in above list
 Lebrina is wholly within Launceston Council area.
 Tunnel is wholly within Launceston area.

See also
List of local government areas of Tasmania

References

External links
Dorset Council official website
Local Government Association Tasmania
Tasmanian Electoral Commission - local government

Local government areas of Tasmania
North East Tasmania
Dorset Council (Australia)